Thijs Sluijter (born 20 February 1980) is a Dutch former professional footballer who played as a left winger. He is currently the manager of SDZ Amsterdam.

Career
Sluijter started his career with SC Heerenveen. In 2001, he left for Heracles.  In June 2006 Sluijter signed with Litex on a free transfer, becoming the first Dutchman to play in the A PFG. Later on he also played for Nea Salamis Famagusta FC in Cyprus, and Slovak football club AS Trencin. He returned to the Netherlands and played for FC Volendam, Almere City and SV Spakenburg, before he signed with ADO '20.

Coaching career
During his time at FC Volendam and Almere City FC, Sluijter worked as a youth coach for the club's alongside his playing career, as well as at AZ Alkmaar. Between 2010 and 2012 he was the manager De Kennemers' reserve team/2nd senior team, with whom he became champion in 2011. He also assisted the first team manager at the club.

Retiring at the end of the 2013–14 season, he immediately became the manager of ADO '20. This was already announced in January 2014. 

In March 2017, Sluijter was appointed assistant manager of OFC Oostzaan under his former teammate at Heracles Almelo, Yuri Rose, from the upcoming season. In the last year, Sluijter had also combined his manager role at ADO '20 with a role as forward coach at SC Telstar. In February 2018 it was confirmed, that Sluijter would become the manager of Vitesse '22 from the 2018–19 season.

In January 2020, it was confirmed that Sluijter had been appointed manager of SDZ Amsterdam from the 2020–21 season.

Honours
Heracles Almelo
 Eerste Divisie: 2004–05

References

1980 births
Living people
People from Uitgeest
Dutch footballers
Dutch football managers
Dutch expatriate footballers
SC Heerenveen players
Heracles Almelo players
FC Volendam players
Almere City FC players
Eredivisie players
Eerste Divisie players
Derde Divisie players
PFC Litex Lovech players
Nea Salamis Famagusta FC players
Cypriot Second Division players
First Professional Football League (Bulgaria) players
Expatriate footballers in Bulgaria
Dutch expatriate sportspeople in Bulgaria
Expatriate footballers in Cyprus
Dutch expatriate sportspeople in Cyprus
AS Trenčín players
Slovak Super Liga players
Expatriate footballers in Slovakia
Dutch expatriate sportspeople in Slovakia
ADO '20 players
Association football midfielders
Footballers from North Holland